Eugène Richez (5 August 1864 - 31 October 1944) was a French archer who competed at the 1908 Summer Olympics in London and at the 1920 Summer Olympics in Antwerp.

Richez entered the men's double York round event in 1908, taking 17th place with 418 points.  He then competed in the Continental style contest, placing 9th at 210 points. Twelve years later he won two silver and one bronze medal.

References

External links
 
 

1864 births
1944 deaths
French male archers
Archers at the 1908 Summer Olympics
Archers at the 1920 Summer Olympics
Olympic archers of France
Olympic silver medalists for France
Olympic bronze medalists for France
Olympic medalists in archery
Medalists at the 1920 Summer Olympics